Шебет је насеље у Србији у општини Гаџин Хан у Нишавском округу. Према попису из 2002. било је 79 становника (према попису из 1991. било је 118 становника).

Према турском попису нахије Ниш из 1516. године, место је било једно од 111 села нахије и носило је назив Себет, а имало је 18 кућа, 4 удовичка домаћинства, 4 самачка домаћинства.[1]

References

Populated places in Nišava District